The 1956 Copa del Generalísimo was the 54th staging of the Spanish Cup. The competition began on 6 May 1956 and concluded on 24 June 1956 with the final.

Round of 16

|}

Quarter-finals

|}

Semi-finals

|}
Tiebreaker

|}

Final

|}

External links
 rsssf.com
 linguasport.com

1956
Copa del Rey
Copa del Rey